Lok-Priya Sant-Kavi Maharaj Chatur Singhji लोक-प्रिय सन्त-कवि महाराज चतुर सिंहजी  reverently known as Bavji Chatur Singhji, was born on Monday 9 February 1880 (V. S. Magh Krishn 14, 1936) at Karjali Haveli to Rani Krishna Kunwar and Maharaj Surat Singh of Karjali. Bavji Chatur Singhji was a popular people's saint-poet of Rajputana, now Rajasthan, India, who was an accomplished yogi also and is rightly remembered as Patanjali and Valmiki of Rajasthan.

Lifetime

Birth and Family 
Lok-Priya Sant-Kavi Maharaj Chatur Singhji reverently known as Bavji Chatur Singhji, was born on Monday 9 February 1880 (V. S. Magh Krishn 14, 1936) at Karjali Haveli to Rani Krishna Kunwar and Maharaj Surat Singh of Karjali.

He was born in the Karjali family which is descendant of Maharaj Bagh Singh, the third son of 61st Maharana Sangram Singh II of Mewad Mewar (Udaipur, Reign AD 1710–1734). Chatur Singhji was youngest of four brothers, eldest Himmet Singh was adopted to Shivrati thikana and he has several offspring, second brother Laxman Singh succeeded his father as the Maharaj of Karjali thikana and he too has numerous progenies, the third brother was Maharaj Tej Singh, who had a daughter Gopal Kunwar who was married to the Thakur of Sankhoon in the Shekhawati region of north Rajputana. Chatur Singhji was married to Laad Kunwar, daughter of Thakur Magan Singh, younger brother of Thakur Inder Singh of Chappoli, being the only child in the family she was named Laad (dear/valued/loved child) Kunwar! Bavji married at the age of 19 years and was blessed with two daughters, one died as a child while the other Sayar Kunwar was married to Maharaj Hamir Singhji of Vijaynagar, Gujarat.

Summed up by a bard as:Note the precedence given to mother's name which is now a statutory requirement

Krishn kookh te prakat bhey,
Tej, Luchh, Himtesh.
Bhrahmleen hey Chatur Guru,
Chatur Kunwar Surtesh.

कृष्ण कूख तें प्रकट भे
तेज लच्छ हिमतेस।
ब्रहम्मलीन हैं चतुर गुरु 
चतुर कुँवर सुरतेस॥

Poet and Social Reformer 
 Bavji Chatur Singhji was a popular people's saint-poet of Rajputana, now Rajasthan, India, who was an accomplished yogi also and is rightly remembered as Patanjali and Valmiki of Rajasthan.
Bavji spread the ancient Indian knowledge through a simple language that a layman could comprehend which helped him in his mission for social reform, but with preservation of Rajasthan's culture and heritage. He effectively propagated promotion of education through "Ramat-Bhanat" concept (रमत-भणत् य़ोजना what is now popular as play-way child education). For his adult education and literacy mission, Bavji spread the concept of "Seekho-Kamao-Khao" सीखो-कमाओ-खाओ –"Learn-Earn-Sustain" (an earlier example of the earn-while-you-learn concept, but the significance of the third component of "Sustain/Maintain" is now being realized after the Global Economic Meltdown of 2008). Bavji also encouraged female education and emancipation – बेना आपां ओछी नी हाँ, आपां तो नारां री नारी हाँ – sisters we are not inferior, in fact, we are tigresses of the tigers. Bavji expressed his concern for the farmers thus: ...ये खावन सब ही को देवे, रेवे सदा भुखारे हैं...ये श्रम करे रात-दिन सारे, बिन श्रम और डकारे हैं ...they feed all but remain hungry...they slog day-night but others gulp-down their gains.... The exemplary communal harmony in this part of India is partly due to Bavji's preaching, one of his compositions states: धरम-धरम सब एक है, पण बरताव अनेक। ईश जाणणो धरम है, जीरो पंथ विवाक॥ All the religions are same, but practices differ. Knowing of the almighty is religion, that's the righteous knowledge.The poet-saint preached that the God resides not in ornate temples, palaces, or mansions but in the hut of a layman; which he succinctly stated in one of his popular couplets: Mano ke mut mano, keno maro kaam, Keeka Dangi re angane rumta dekiya Raam – मानो के मत मानो, केणो मारो काम। कीका डांगी रे आँगणे, रमता देखिया राम॥-Believe it or not, but it's my responsibility to tell you, I have seen the Almighty play in the premises of Keeka Dangi (an ordinary villager of Nauwa rural community).Bavji's simple living and comprehensible high thinking made him a popular "Lok-Sikshusk" लोक शिक्षक – Peoples' Educator – that started awakening in Rajasthan.

The Academy for Rajasthani Language, Literature, & Culture, Bikaner (राजस्थानी भाषा, साहित्य एवं संस्कृति अकादमी, बीकानेर) has instituted an annual award in honor of Bavji-"Bavji Chatur Singhji Anuvaad Puruskaar" (बावजी चतुरसिहं जी अनुवाद पुरस्कार Bavji Chatur Singhji Translation Award) for translation of worthy literary work into Rajasthani language, its value has now been increased to Rs. 30,000/-.
 
The New Education Policy-NEP 2020 announced by the Union Government in August 2020 says that the first five years of education of a child should be in his mother-tongue. This fulfills the agenda of Bavji that the infants SHOULD be educated in their mother tongue, he advocated it nearly a hundred years before the present. To quote him: ...बाळकां ने पराई बोली भणावणो शुरू करे अणी शूं बाळकां ने घनी अबकाई पडे। शुण्डा री नांई पढ़ लेवे पण समझ में नी आवा शू भण भण ने भूलता जावे... " a child will not comprehend what is taught to him in "Paraee boli"='other's language', he may cram but will not understand and retain knowledge. To achieve this a child should get his early education in his mother tongue...for which I have written this book"  (#17 and also # 16 below in the list of publications).

Beginning as a Saint 
Bavji lived during the reign of Maharana Fateh Singh (Reign 1884–1930, the 73rd Maharana) who was his uncle. The untimely demise of his wife in the year 1907 and then the adult issueless daughter one year after her marriage drove him further towards spiritual pursuits. He shifted from the Karjali Haveli in Udaipur to Telion-ki-Sarai, where the present-day BN College is located and then to a modest cottage (KOTRI) on HAWA MAGRI (airy hill) at Sukher (N24° 38' 29" : E073° 43' 08", elevation 613m) a village of Karjali jagir, 10-km north of Udaipur, now on National Highway # 8. Thereafter he moved to a similar modest setup at the other Karjali thikana village Nauwa (N24° 41' 29" : E073° 48' 11", elevation 584 m), 22 km east of Udaipur, because it is widely believed that Singhi HRISHI and other Puranic saints had their Ashram (hermitage at N24° 42' 08" : E073° 45' 55", elevation 701m ) in this serene valley within the geologically significant Aravalli hills.

Move to Nauwa 
Bavji's KOTRI (CHATUR SADHNA STHAL) at KHAANU MANGRI was restored with great fanfare by late Shri Niranjan Nath Acharya, the then Speaker of Rajasthan Legislative Assembly ( 03.5.1967 to 20.3.1972) and MLA of the area on 13 January 1966 with the financial support of Maharana Mewar Foundation and material support of Karjali family. Maharana Bhagwat Singhji unveiled the marble statue of Bavji in presence of several dignitaries of Rajasthan. Every year on V.S. PAUSH SUKL 3 (~January) a fair and spiritual event is held at Nauwa to commemorate the Enlightenment Day (ATM SHAKSHAATKAAR) of Maharaj Chatur Singhji. This holy site, which has now become a celebrated pilgrim center, was also visited by Sardar Hukam Singh, the Governor of Rajasthan (1967–73) along with Chief Minister Mohan Lal Sukhadia (1954–1971) accompanied by the Mines Minister Harideo Joshi (later CM of Rajasthan 1973–77; 1985–88; 1989–1990). Bavji expired at Karjali Haveli at the not-so-ripe age of 49 on 1 July 1929 (V. S. AASHAAD KRISHN 9, 1986) following a brief illness; this cut short the journey of a prolific spiritual writer and social reformer.

Early Years and Traits – व्यक्तित्व Vyaktitva 

Bavji Chatur Singhji received his education at home through tutors Pandit Kripa Shankarji and Pandit Hiralalji Dashora and was educated in Hindi (Devanagri), Sanskrit, Gujarati, Marathi, Urdu and English languages which helped him study the ancient Indian scriptures (vedant Vedanta, Samkhya, yog Yoga and other philosophies), the Bible, the Koran, along with Baudh Buddha & Jain Jainism scriptures and the works of Tulsi Tulsidas, Soor Surdas, Kabir, Meera, Guru Nanak Guru Nanak Dev, Dadu, etc. Bavji Chatur Singhji strongly felt, which are reflected in his writings and discourses, that religion is a social code of conduct that is necessary for the maintenance of orderly human society. Bavji therefore published the gist of various religious scriptures, including concise treatise in Mewadi on Ramayan Ramayana, Bhagwad Gita in simple Rajasthani (Mewadi), the mother tongue of the local public so that a lay man can understand and adopt the path of righteousness. To that extent his contribution to the society is indeed invaluable and trend-setting. This is the reason for his popularity and public reverence. He greatly emphasized on social reforms (especially women's emancipation, BENAN AAPAN AUCHI NEE HAN), value-based education, adherence to moral values, constructive philosophies of life, and observance of yogic practices. Bavji also published his thoughts in magazines and newspapers of the day with the help of Ratan Lalji Dhankuta. Bavji used to organize weekly poetry meetings at Karjali Haveli under the aegis of "SUKH SAMAJ" (Happy Society) which was coordinated by Shri Ram Pratap Jotkhiji; the best poet of the meet was garlanded and the second best was presented a bouquet. Kids of the family, the numerous nephews and nieces, were encouraged to attend these meetings to give them right SANSKARIK exposure.  He created a personal library that had more than a thousand books. He greatly impressed the noted writer Hari Bhau Upadhhaya who was disappointed during his trip to Udaipur at the lack of people of literary competence in the city, until he met Bavji.

Bavji Chatur Singhji attained Enlightenment on Sunday the V.S. PAUSH SUDH TEEJ 1978 (31 January 1922) when he wrote ALAKH PACCHEESI, TUHI ASHTAK, ANUBHAV PRAKASH. He was against copyright aspect of knowledge dispersal and therefore his publications famously asked readers not to use it to hurt anyone's sentiments but for self-emancipation and the reader could make modifications and improvements in the writings if he wished!

Following the untimely demise of Bavji's wife, when he was just 27 years old, he was approached to remarry to which Bavji replied that "…had I died, would have my widow got married again? – An unheard of and unacceptable act at that time – therefore man too should also follow the same principle in life!" Another reformist incidence is regarding marriage of his daughter. Bavji was granted the jagir of Falasiya for his administration by the Karjali thikana. During those days a levy in the name of "BAI BARAAD" was collected to raise fund for marriage of jagirdar's daughter. Bavji flatly refused to collect it and took a loan of Rs. 5000/- from Maharana Fateh Singhji to meet marriage expenses which he kept really modest to set a right example for others to follow. He was embodiment of simple living and high thinking that he adopted in his daily dress and food codes. He successfully settled people's dispute under his command through his mature logic and well reasoned persuasion.

During the great famine of 1913 the land tax that was collected in his jagir was transferred to a Society that provided interest-free loan to farmers, this was the start of a cooperative movement which was unfortunately sabotaged by the money-lenders and the farmers who had no idea about the concept wanted their money back. Knowing that the returned cash would be squandered by the farmers, he got silver lady's ornaments (HANSLIYAN) made and returned to family women folks for safe keeping! Villagers still admiringly remember this incidence.  His wife had borrowed a pearl necklace from her Chappoli family member, which Bavji got returned on demise of his wife. Bagore Maharaj Sohan Singh died without an heir and therefore his widow wanted to adopt Bavji as the Maharaj of Bagore but Bavji, who had no interest in material properties, was not tempted at the offer and refused adoption! It is recalled that four Maharanas were adopted from the Bagore family – Maharana Sardar Singhji (1838–1842), Maharana Swaroop Singhji (1842–1861), Maharana Shambhu Singhji (1861–1874) and Maharana Sajjan Singhji (1874–1884).

In search of Truth and a Guru 

Chatur Singhji's father Maharaj Surat Singhji was a pious man who held meetings with spiritual personalities at his haveli and undertook frequent pilgrimages across India. Young Chatur Singh always attended these meetings and trips and was therefore exposed to religious discourses. He was also exposed to the experience of poetry writing by his father. Bavji's elder brother Tej Singh was an accomplished musician. With such a family environment and following the untimely demise of his wife, Bavji went out for pilgrimage in search of peace and truth of life. He stayed at Radha Kund in Vrindavan for five years, thereafter he went to Mathura for a short period and then to Omkareshwar, one of the 12 revered Jyotiling shrines of Lord Shiv located on the Om-shaped Island in the sacred river Narmada. There he approached a reputed yogi-saint Kamal Bhartiji and sought spiritual and yogic guidance. The saint famously said "…why are you wondering to all these far-out places, when you have Thakur Gumaan Singh the younger brother of Batheda Rawat Dalel Singhji in your home-state, approach him and he will guide you to your destiny". Bavji rushed to Kaka Thakur Gumaan Singhji (Birth 1840, Enlightenment 1894, Demise 1914) at Batheda who granted him the knowledge of Raj Rajeshwar Yog, SANKHYA philosophy and poem and prose scripting. They had a rewarding association at "Ram-Jharokha" the ASHRAM of Guru Gumaan at Laxmanpura village (24° 36' 16" N: 73° 58' 17"E), 30 km east of Udaipur.

Associates, Devotees and Disciples 

Amongst the chief associates of Bavji mention should be made of Pandit Shobha Lalji Dashora, Pandit Girdhari Lalji Shashtri, Thakur Ram Singhji of Kelwa, Sahu Kapoorchand Agrawal, Pandit Jetha Lalji Dashora, Pandit Ratan Lalji Ameta, Pandit Uma Shankarji Dwevedi, Sahu Chanadan Malji Bhanawat, Dr. Basanti Lalji Mahatma, and Kika Dangi of Nauwa. Mahatma Bhuri Bai was one of his well-known disciples. Other well-known Sat-Sanghi of Bavji include: Shri Laxmi Lal Joshi, Babuji Parmanandji, Sawai Singhji Amet, Chain Sighji Batheda, Sadvi Kamla Kunwar Laxamanpura, Kr. Jagat Singhji and Kr. Abhay Singhji Karjali, Kr. Shivdan Singhji Shivrati, Baisa Ratan Kunwar of Shivrati, Lal Singhji Shaktawat Jagat, Mehtab Singhji Laxmanpura...The first research paper on Bavji was written by Dr. Sangram Singh Ranawat under the guidance of Prof. K. C. Shautriya, the Head of Hindi Department, MB College, Udaipur in 1957, which was published as a booklet by PRATAP SHAUDH PRATISTHAN, VIDYA PRACHARINI SABHA, Udaipur in the year 1963. Bavji's literature is taught in Mohan Lal Sukhadia University, Udaipur, ML Sukhadia University , Jai Narayan Vyas University, Jodhpur JN Vyas University, Jodhpur and Vardhaman Mahaveer Open University Kota.A scholar of Rajasthani literature at ML Sukhadia University Udaipur, Mr. Mangi Lal Nagda wrote Post Graduate dissertation on Bavji and Dr. Bheru Prakash Dadheech has been awarded PhD on the works of Bavji by the JN Vyas University.

During Bavji's period his bhajans (devotional songs), dohas (couplets), poems were sung by the renowned singer Gopal Gandharv. During the next generation Raghunath Katha and his Group (bhajan mandali), Gopalji's son Chandra Gandharv, daughter Laxmi Gandharv and daughter-in-law Sashi Gandharv used to sing Bavji's bhajans and songs for the All India Radio and at public functions across the country. Shri Sukh Lal Damami of Rodji-ka-Kheda popularized Bavji's bhajans/poems in villages of Mewad.The tradition is presently being carried forward by Pushkar "Gupteshwar" (पुष्कर "गुप्तेश्वर") & his party who are popular singer of Bavji's works; his audio cassettes/CDs are also well accepted in which Bavji's Chandrashekhar Stotr (चँद्रशेखर स्तोत्र), Alakh Pachhisee (अलख पच्चीसी) are most admired. An audio CD of Ambalal Bhawsaar (अम्बालाल भवसार) entitled चतर सिंह जी रौ विचार शील वैभव-"Chatur Singhji Bavji's Vichhaar-sheel Vaibhav"-Glory of Bavji Chatur Singhji's Thoughtful Heritage-has also been brought out (2011).

Several writers and poets have written prose, poems and lectured on Bavji, chief amongst them are late Thakur Ram Singhji of Kelwa, Nathu Singhji Mehiariya, Padma-Shri Rani Lakshmi Kumari Chundawat, Sobhagya Singhji Shekhawat, Kesar Singhji Barhet, Kavi Bhushan Jagadish of Bhinder, Prithvi Singhji Chauhan 'Premi' of Bhinder, Suraj Chandra Dangi of Badi Sadri, Radhey Shyam Mehta, Dev Karan Singhji Roopaheli, Prof. Mathura Prasad and Dr. Kamala Agrawal, Niranjan Nathji Acharya, Pandit Janardhan Rai Nagar, Bhai Bhagwan, Nand Chaturvedi, Prof. MMS Mathur, Prof. Onkar Singhji Kelwa... 
Maharana Bhagwat Singhji Mewad (reign 1955–1984) republished Bavji's major literary works during his birth centenary year (1980) and set up a room in Bavji's honor in the City Palace Museum, Udaipur. The reputed and widely-read spiritual journal "KALYAN", published by Gita Press, Gorakhpur, UP, also brought out special issues on BHAGTA-ANK (1928) and YOGANK (1935) in which Bavji's literature, philosophy, and contributions were discussed. The main objective of the Udaipur Chapter of INTACH is to popularize the cultural heritage of Mewad.

For the daily help and company, Bavji had Roopa, Kanna, Devla, Uddha, Shankar and Bavji composed many a poem addressed to them for dispersal of his social reformist ideas.

The renowned Rajasthani writer and social activist Padma-Shri Rani Lakshmi Kumari Chundawat (b. 24 June 1916) dedicated her book "Moomal" (1961) to Bavji Chatur Singhji in the following words4:

समरपण
राजस्थानी गद्य रा उध्दार करणिया
पू'च्योडा़ भगत अर योगी
जगव्हाला जुग आदरिया
जो राज'म्हेलां सूं उतर जणा जणा रा मन मंदिर में बस गिया
ज्यां री पोथ्यां आज तांई मेवाड़ रा घर घर में
गीता भागवत ज्यूं बांची जावे
ज्यां रा बणायोडा़ भजन गांव गांव में लोकगीतां री नांई गाइजे
वां महाराज श्री चतुरसिंघजी री पावन यादगारी ने
घणा मांन सूं भेँट

Dedication
The redeemer of Rajasthani literature
The Superior saint and yogi
The universally ever respected
The one who moved out of palace and in the hearts of the populace
The one whose literary creations are in the every house of Mewad
Read with the reverence of the Bhagwat Gita
The one whose devotional songs are sung like the folk songs
In the reverend memory of that Maharaj Shri Chatur Singhji
This book is dedicated with great regards!

Late Shri Niranjan Nath Acharya, the then Speaker of the Rajasthan Legislative Assembly, published a booklet entitled "Chatur Chandno" 'चतुर चादंणो' (The radiance of Chatur Singh) containing Bavji's more popular poems. In its Foreword he states:

Maharaj Chatur Singhji was an enlightened personality in addition to being a great poet (word-smith!). 
His creations are a balanced blend of spiritual knowledge and folk behavior. 
With the help of our day-to-day incidences, narrated in a simple language, 
he has explained the most difficult knowledge in a manner that is easily understood 
and the matter touches our heart and mind.

Additionally, Bavji's poems and couplets are worth rendering at any time and at all the social functions / occasions – on hearing them one is blessed with peace, purity, and renewed radiance.

You all are requested to read and make children and people-at-large read Bavji's literature and to popularize it for spread of new knowledge and new light (Chandano) for the bliss of heart and mind.

With this objective I present this "CHATUR CHANDANO" so that the light of knowledge will spread in all direction to rid of the darkness of mind.

Niranjan Nath Acharya,Compiler

महाराज श्री चतरसिंहजी एक सिध्द पुरूष होने के साथ साथ अच्छे कवि भी थे। उनकी रचनाओं में ईश्वर ज्ञान और लोक व्यवहार का सुन्दर मिश्रण है। कठिन से कठिन ज्ञान तत्व को हमारे जीवन के दैनिक व्यवारों के उदाहरणों से समझाते हुए सुन्दर लोक भाषा में इस चतुराई से ढाला है कि उनके गीत, उनमें बताई गई बात एक दम गले उतर कर हृदय में जम जाती हैं, मनुष्य का मस्तिष्क उसे पकड़ लेता है।

एक बात और है। बावजी चतुर सिंहजी के गीत और दोहे जीवन की हर घड़ी, विवाह-शादी, समारोह, आदि अवसरों पर गाये-सूनाये जाने योग्य है। उन्हें सुनने, सुनाने वाले के मन भी शान्ती, शुध्दता और नई रोशनी मिलती है।

आप सभी सज्जनों से निवेदन हैं कि इस महान् सन्त कवि बावजी चतुर सिंहजी की कविताओं को पढ़े अन्य बालक बालिकाओं और लोगों को पढ़ावे और समाज में अधिक से अधिक प्रचार कर लोगों के मन और मस्तिष्क को नया ज्ञान, नया पृकाश, (चादंणो) ओर नया आनन्द दे।

इसी पुण्य उद्देश्य से यह 'चतुर चादंणो' आपकी सेवा में प्रस्तुत है। आशा है उनकी रचनाओं में ज्ञान का जो चांदणा (चांद का पृकाश) चारों और फैला कर लोगों के मन के अन्धेरे को दूर करेगा।

निरंजन नाथ आचार्य,संकलनकर्ता

HOW TO REACH NAUWA: The village NAUWA is located in Mavlli tehsil of Udaipur district. The nearest railhead is KHEMLI station on Udaipur- Mavli Jn of NWR. One can travel by road from Mavli or Udaipur or Nathdwara or Eklingji.

Tribute of Gopal Gandharv to Bavji

...RAMAYAN RAGHUKUL MAAREG NEY, BHINN-BHINN SAMJAYO.
GEETA RA SUB GUUDH GYAN NE, UNPUD TUK PAHUCHAYAO.
BHAGVA BHESH KIYO NAHI KABHU, NAHI TUN BHASM RAMAYO
ALAKH PACHEESI VANAYI APOORAB, BHRAHM GYAN PRAGATAYO.
...AAKHIN OAT BHAYE MAHARAJA, GHUT BHEETER PRAGTAYE.
RATTAN PRASHAD MILI CHINTAMANI, GUN GOPALO GAVE.
...
रामायण रघुकुल मारगने, भिन्न भिन्न समझायो।
गीतारा गूढ़ ज्ञानने, अणपढ़ तक पहुंचायो॥
भगवां भेष कियो नहिं कबहू, नहिं तन भस्म रमायो।
अलख पचीसी वणाय अपूरब, ब्रह्म ज्ञान प्रगटायो॥...
आखिन ओट भये महाराजा, घट भीतर प्रगटाये।
रतन प्रसादि मिली चिंतामणि, गुण गोपालो गावे॥

Ramayan's path of righteousness was explained by you,
You also enlightened the unlettered with the lofty teachings of the Geeta,
You neither dressed in saffron, nor smeared your body with ash,
You elucidated The Invisible and the ultimate knowledge,
Oh Maharaja, living a simple domestic life, you achieved enlightenment,
Gopal (Gandharv) can not but sing your praise!

The renowned Rajasthani scholar Hiralal Maheshwari commented and translated Bavji's couplets as follows5:

Maharaj Catursinha (महाराज चतरसिंह 1880–1929) is considered a great yogi, bhakt and poet of Mewad, where his poems are still popular...he has pleaded for the uplift of women and farmers and desistance from all social evils, practices, and superstitions. He urged that children should be taught in their mother tongue. Here are three verses from Catur Cintamani (चतुर चिन्तांमणि):

पर घर पग नी मैलणो, बना मान मनवार।
अंजन आवै देखनै, सिंगल रो सतकार॥ 269

Don't step into a house unless respectfully and beseechingly invited. 
Even a railway engine steams into a station only when invited by the signal.

ऊँध सूधने छोड़ने, करणो काम पछाण।
कर ऊँधो सूँधो घड़ो, तरती भरती दाँण॥ 273

Invert or upward as strictly as occasion demands. 
Invert the pitcher if you have to swim with it and turn it up if you want to fill it with water.

भावै लख भगवंत जश, भावे गाळाँ भाँड।
द्वात कलम रो दोष नी, मन व्हे' ज्यो ही मांड॥ 286

Pen and ink are not responsible for the contents of the script. 
With them you can write obeisance or obscenity according to the dictates of your mind.

A bard has rightly said of him:

Bhuja Chatur sukh de bhalo,varan chatur ney both.
Maas Chatur soo jull-unn miley, gyan Chatur Gahlot.

भुजा चतुर सुख दे भलो, बरण चतुर ने बोत।
मास चतुर सूं जळ-अन्न मिले, ज्ञान चतुर गहलोत।

The four armed Almighty provides pleasure to all the four sections of the society,
The four months of monsoon provide us water & food  where as Chatur Gahlot provides us blissful knowledge!  

On the occasion of 132nd birthday of Bavji (22 January 2012), nonagenarian Radheyshyam Mehta brought out a booklet with 108 couplets in honor of Bavji- "चतुर चितारणी (स्मरणाञ्जलि)Chatur Remembrance". Sample these three:

तिलक करे छापा करे, भगमा भेष वणाय। चतुर सन्त री सादगी, सन्ता ऊपर जाय॥23

Holy men smear forehead/ body and wear saffron clothing (& remain unmarried), but Chatur leads a domestic simple life and still attains higher stature.

पगे पगरखी गांवरी, ऊँची धोती पैर। कांधे ज्ञान पछेवड़ो, चतुर चमक चहुँफेर॥50
 
A villager's footwear & leg wear, on the shoulder is the cloth-sheet of knowledge, still the radiance of Chatur is everywhere.
 
Bavji was strong advocate of women's education which is acknowledged thus: 
 
कूकी ने काका लिख्यो, पोथी थोड़ी वांच। एक पोथी मन धार ले, जाणेगा थूं सांच॥90
 
Niece gets a letter from uncle (Chatur) get started studying, select right literature to understand the truth.

Publications ज्ञान गंगा 

Bavji propagated the spiritual and social reformist knowledge of humanity in mother tongue of the local public (Rajasthan) and wrote both prose and poetry which are widely read by all the sections of the society with great reverence. His major works during the short span of about seven years (1922–1929) are given below :

 
His important publications are:
 
1.	Alakh Pacchisee अलख पचीसी
2.	Tuhi Ashtak तुही अष्टक
3.	Anubhav Prakash अनुभव प्रकाश
4.	Chatur Prakash चतुर प्रकाश
5.	Hanummetpanchak हनुमत्पंचक
6.	Ambikashtuk अम्बिकाष्टक
7.	Shesh Charitra शेष-चरित्र
8.	Chatur Chintamani: Dohawali/Padawali चतुर चिन्तांमणिः दोहावली/पदावली
9.	Saman Bateesi समान बत्तीसी
10.	Shiv Mahimnah Stotra शिव महिम्नः स्तोत्र 
11.	Chandrashekhar Stotra चद्रंशेखर स्तोत्र
12.	Shree Geetaji श्री गीताजी
13.	Maanav Mitra: Ram Charitra मानव मित्र रामचरित्र
14.	Parmarth Vichaar: in Seven volumes परमाथॆ विचार : सात भाग
15.	Hraday Rahashya ह्रदय रहस्य
16.	Balkan ri Vaar बाळकां री वार
17.	Balkan ri Pothi बाळकां री पोथी 
18.	Lekh Sangrah लेख संग्रह
19.	Saankhya Kareeka सांख्यकारिका
20.	Tatva Samaas तत्व समास
21.	Yog Sutra योग सूत्र	

The main publishers of Bavji's literature were: 1. Mewad Shiv Shakti Peeth, City Palace, Udaipur.
2. Sanskrit Granthagar, O/s Chanpole, Udaipur. 3. Bhartiya Pustak Bhandar, Nani Gali, Jagadeesh Chowk, Udaipur. 4. Hiteshi Pustak Bhandar, Surajpole, Udaipur. 5. Maharana Mewar Foundation, City
Palace, Udaipur. 6. Mewad Kshatriya Maha Sabha, Central Unit, Chitrakoot Nagar, Bhuwana, Udaipur. 7. Chirag Prakashan, Prabhat Nagar, Sector 5, Udaipur. 8. Chatur Bagh, 5, Residency Road, Sardarpura, Udaipur.

Bavji also wrote several letters to his friends, relatives, associates, which are also highly enlightening, some of these have been published by the recipients. He also published his thoughts in magazines and newspapers. 

 

Signature of Bavji Chatur Singhji on the "Dedication"- MANSIK SEVA NAJRANO – mental service presentation – of his newly published treatise on Ramayana – MAANAV MITRA: SHRI RAM CHARITRA 
to Maharana Fateh Singhji of Mewad (his uncle)

His religious philosophy is best presented in one of his more popular Bhajan (devotional song).

धरम रा गेला री गम नी है, जीशूँ अतरी लड़ा लड़ी है॥
शंकर, बद्ध, मुहम्मद, ईशा, शघलां साँची की' है।
अरथ सबांरो एक मिल्यो है, पण बोली बदली है॥...

Path of religion is not such,
That there should be so much fight and destruction,
Shanker, Buddha, Mohammad, Jesus,
Have all taught righteousness,
Meaning of their teachings is one,
Only the tongues differ....

Cause of the problem has also been stated by him in the same Bhajan:

...आप आपरो मत आछो पण, आछो आप नहीं है। 
आप आपरा मत री निंदा, आप आप शूं व्ही है॥...

...Our individual belief is good, but (sadly) WE are not good.
Our own belief has been betrayed by ourselves only...

The couplet (sortha, in which the first and third segments rhyme, but in a doha the second and fourth segments rhyme) on the portrait of Bavji sings praise of WORK – Work is Worship:

मेनत ने सुख मान, आरामी आलस गणे।
मूरख वी मज मान, दो दनरा है देवला॥

Mehnat ne such maan,Aarami aalus guney,
Moorakh vi muj maan, do dun ra hai dewla

Consider work a bliss, laziness leads one nowhere,
Oh fool! Do accept that the life is but short.

The following three dohas of Bavji are doing round these days on the Facebook. As in above cases, their transliteration in Roman script and the thematic translations in English, but not the philosophical one, are given below which are of contemporary relevance. The first deals with the rampart corruption that we see all around and the second is regarding the atrocities on women. The third is regarding making oneself of relevance to the society.

मुरदा मौजा घर करे, जिंदा जले मशाण।Murda muaja ghar kare, Jinda jale mashaan,
अश्या नगर रो नाथ है, ऊद्या अलख पहचाण॥Ashiya nagar ro naath hey, udaiya alkh pahechaan!

The (morally) dead are enjoying life, but the (morally) alive are burning on pyre,
Such is the ruler of the land, take heed O! countryman!

नारी नारी ने जाणे, पर नर सू अणजाण।
जाण व्हियां पे नी जणे, उद्या अलख पहचाण॥

Naari nur ne janey, per nur soo unjaan,
Jaan vihyan pe ni juney, udiya alakh pehchaan.

A Woman knows woman, but is unaware of man (his misdeeds),
She wouldn't deliver him if she knows his true self!

रेटं फरै चरक्यो फरै, पण फरवा मे फेर। 
वो तो वाड़ हर्यो करै, वी छूंता रो ढेर।

Raint phurey charkiyo pharey, pun furva mein pher.
Who to vaad hariyo karey, wein chuntha ko dher.

Water-wheel rotates so does the sugarcane crusher, 
While one greens the field, other yields trash!

Four of the more popular Shloks (श्लोक) from the Great Geeta – their original Sanskrit text (each with Chapter & Shlok number), their Roman transliteration, their समश्लोकी translation in Mewadi by Bavji, and their English translation6 are given below:

कर्मण्येवाधिकारस्ते मा फलेषु कदाचन।
मा कर्मफलहेतुर्भूर्मा ते संगोऽस्त्वकर्मणि॥2.47॥

Karmanyevadhikaraste maa phalesu kadachan,
Maa karmaphalaheturbhurma te sango'stvakarmani

कर्म रो अधिकारी थूं, कर्म रा फळ रो नहीं।
छोड़ दे फळ री इच्छा, छोड़ दे कर्म त्याग रो॥

So, O Arjun, your duty is in doing your deed, and not in its consequences. 
Hence do not get keyed up to the fruits of your labor. But don't neglect your duty also.

क्रोधाभ्दवति सम्मोहः सम्मोहात्स्र्मतिविर्भमः।
सर्मतिर्भंशाद् बुध्दिनाशो बुध्दिनाशात्र्पणश्यति॥ 2.63॥

Krodhadbhavati sammohah sammohatsmrtivibhramah
Smrtibhramsad buddhinasho buddhinashatpranasyati

क्रोध शूँ भूलवा लागे, भूल शूँ सुध वीशरे।
पछे व्हे' बुध्दी रो नाश, जदी नाश सबी व्हियो॥

The anger leads to stupidity and stupidity causes confused memory.
A confuse memory destroys wisdom that leads to destruction.

यदा यदा हि धर्मस्य ग्लानिर्भवति भारत।
अभ्युत्यानधर्मस्य तदात्मानं सृजाम्यहम्॥4.7॥

Yada yada hi dharmasya glanirbhavati bharat
Abhyutthanamadharmasya tadatmanamn srjamyaham

धर्म री घटती होवे, जीं जीं समय अरजुण।
अधर्म वधवा लागे, जदी म्हूं अवतार लूं॥

O Bharata (Arjun)! Whenever the forces of light (goodness or nobility) are on the retreat.
And the forced of darkness (evil) on the advance (threatening to take over), I create my human form (incarnate).

पुण्या गंधः पृथिव्यञ्च तेज श्वास्मि विभवसो।
जीवनं सर्वभूतेषु तपश्वास्मि तपस्विषु॥7.9॥

Punyo gandhah prthivyam chu tejashchami vibhavasau
Jivanam sarvabhutesu tapashchasmi tapasvisu

पवित्र गंध पृथ्वी में, अग्नी तेज हूं म्हूं ही।
जींवां में जीवणो जाण, तपसी में म्हूं ही तप॥

In earth I am its sacred scent, heat in fire, 
Life in living beings and penance in sages.

7. Late Kr. Harish Chandra Singh Karjali, the great-grandnephew of Bavji, with his wife Krn. Pramila Kumari and their daughter's son Shivam Singh Dugari at the Chatur Sadhana Sthal, Nauwa (1991)

8. Kuki Taruna Kumari, daughter of Kr. Harish Chandra Singh Karjali, feeding the children of Nauwa village at the Chatur Sadhana Sthal, Nauwa (1991)

9. Pushkar Gupteshwar Bhajan Mandali singing Bavji's bhajans (devotional songs) and a fan dancing to it.

10. Another devotee dancing to Bavji's bhajan

References

External links 
www.geologydata.info
www.intach.org
www.mlsu.ac.in 
www.jnvu.edu.in
www.intach.org

Further reading 
Aadhyatm Diksha. 1999. Ed. SS Vyas & RS Mehta. Unique Publ., Udaipur, 41 p. A collection of letters of Bavji Chatur Singhji to his niece Smt. Ratan Kunwar Ranawat
Shiv Mahimnah Stotra. 1994. Ed. Radhey Shayam, Ganga Lal Mehta. Chaudhary Printers, Udaipur, 45 p
Sant Ram Singhji Kelwa – Vyaktitv Avm Kratitv. 2010. Onkar Singh Rathore. Chirag Publications, Udaipur. 95 p.
Yog Bhanu Prakashika, 1902, reprinted 1992. A treatise on Geeta by Yogivarya Thakur Gumaan Singhji. Maharana Mewar Historical Publication Trust, Udaipur. 200 p.g

20th-century Indian philosophers
Rajasthani literature
Rajasthani-language writers